Acanthodactylus micropholis, known commonly as the Persian fringe-toed lizard and the yellowtail fringe-fingered lizard, is a species of lizard in the family Lacertidae. The species is endemic to Asia.

Geographic range
A. micropholis is found in Afghanistan, Iran, and Pakistan.

Reproduction
A. micropholis is oviparous.

References

Further reading
Blanford WT (1874). "Descriptions of new Reptilia and Amphibia from Persia and Baluchistán". Annals and Magazine of Natural History, Fourth Series 14: 31–35. (Acanthodactylus micropholis, new species, p. 33). (in English and Latin).
Boulenger GA (1887). Catalogue of the Lizards in the British Museum (Natural History). Second Edition. Volume III. Lacertidæ ... London: Trustees of the British Museum (Natural History). (Taylor and Francis, printers). xii + 575 pp. + Plates I-XL. (Acanthodactylus micropholis, p. 63).
Boulenger GA (1890). The Fauna of British India, Including Ceylon and Burma. Reptilia and Batrachia. London: Secretary of State for India in Council. (Taylor and Francis, printers). xviii + 541 pp. (Acanthodactylus micropholis, p. 171).
Kamali, Kamran (2013). "Geographic Distribution: Acanthodactylus micropholis (Persian fringe-toed lizard)". Herpetological Review 44 (2): 272–273.
Smith MA (1935). The Fauna of British India, Including Ceylon and Burma. Reptilia and Amphibia. Vol. II.—Sauria. London: Secretary of State for India in Council. (Taylor and Francis, printers). xiii + 440 pp. + Plate I + 2 maps. (Acanthodactylus micropholis, p. 373).

Acanthodactylus
Lizards of Asia
Reptiles described in 1874
Taxa named by William Thomas Blanford